Betty Blowtorch is an all-female American hard rock band from Southern California.

Biography
The band was formed in 1998 by three members of Butt Trumpet. After releasing the 2001 album, Are You Man Enough?, the group toured with Nashville Pussy. During the tour, drummer Judy Molish and guitarist Sharon Needles left the group; Jennifer Finch from L7 and drummer Dave Gara joined in their stead. 

On December 15, 2001, lead singer and bassist Bianca Halstead (Butthole) was killed in a car crash while on tour in New Orleans. The remaining group members disbanded.

A collection of rarities and live performances was released as Last Call in 2003.

They are the focus of Antonia Scarpa's documentary film, Betty Blowtorch And Her Amazing True Life Adventures.

In 2008–2009, Blare N. Bitch and Sharon Needles were both members of  Los Angeles based bands, Psychostar and Suckerstar.
Blare N. Bitch played guitar for an all-female Black Sabbath tribute band, Black Sabbitch while Sharon Needles and Judy Molish played in all-female AC/DC tribute band Hell's Belles. 

All the original band members are currently playing shows with Mia X RockNRolla, who plays bass and lead vocals for Bianca. They are working on new music as of 2021.

Members
Bianca Butthole (Bianca Halstead) – bass, vocals
Sharon Needles – rhythm guitar, vocals
Blare N. Bitch – lead guitar
Judy Molish – drums
 Mia X RockNRolla – vocals, bass

Discography
Get Off (Foil Records, 1999)
"Betty Blowtorch Anthem"
"Fish Taco"
"I Wanna Be Your Sucker"
"Shut Up & Fuck"
"Party Til Ya Puke"
"Get Off"
Are You Man Enough? (Foodchain Records, 2001)
"Hell On Wheels"
"Love/Hate"
"Size Queen" (featuring Vanilla Ice)
"I Wanna Be Your Sucker"
"I'm Ugly and I Don't Know Why"
"Shut Up and Fuck"
"No Integrity"
"Frankie"
"I Wish You'd Die"
"Big Hair, Broken Heart"
"Part-Time Hooker"
"Rock My World"
"Dresses"
"Strung Out"
"Rock 'N Roll 69"
Last Call (Foodchain Records, 2003)
"Rock My World"
"Party 'Til Ya Puke"
"I Wanna Be On Epitaph"
"Fish Taco"
"Shrinkwrap"
"Limousines"
"Van"
"Dresses"
"Shut Up And Fuck"
"Diarrhea"
"Changing Underwear"
"Yesterday II, The Sequel"
"Frankie"
"I Wanna Be Your Sucker"
"Ode To Dickhead"
"Dickhead On The Radio"
"Get Off"
"Kill The Butcher"
"Teenage Whore"
"Funeral Crashing Tonite"
"T.I.T."
"Rock 'n Roll 85"
"Love/Hate"
"I've Been So Mad Lately"
"Johnny Depp"
"Size Queen"
"I'm Ugly And I Don't Know Why"
"Betty Blowtorch Anthem"
"Hell On Wheels"

References

External links
Official website

Betty Blowtorch and Her Amazing True Life Adventures on Rotten Tomatoes

All-female bands
Musical groups from Los Angeles
Hard rock musical groups from California